LoneStarCon 1 was the third North American Science Fiction Convention, held in Austin, Texas, on August 30-September 2, 1985, at the Hyatt Regency Austin, Sheraton Crest, and Palmer Auditorium. LoneStarCon 1 was also known as "The First Occasional Lone Star Science Fiction Convention & Chili Cook-off" and "ChiliCon".  This NASFiC was held because Melbourne, Australia, was selected as the location for the 1985 Worldcon.

Guests of honor
 Jack Vance, Writer
 Richard Powers, Artist
 Joanne Burger, Fan
 Chad Oliver, Toastmaster

Information

Site selection
After Aussiecon Two in Melbourne, Australia, was selected as the World Science Fiction Convention to be held in 1985, the WSFS Business Meeting directed that a written ballot election be held to select a NASFiC site for that year. In a three-way race, Austin (393 votes) easily bested Detroit, Michigan (132 votes) and Columbus, Ohio (69 votes) as well as a single write-in vote for Highmore, South Dakota.

Committee
 Chair: Willie Siros
 Vice-Chair: Robert Taylor

See also
 World Science Fiction Society

References

External links
 NASFiC Official Site
 Fandom Association of Central Texas
 

North American Science Fiction Convention
Culture of Austin, Texas
Conventions in Texas
1985 in the United States